Charles Alphonse Brot (12 April 1807 – 3 January 1895) was a prolific French author and playwright.

Life

Charles Alphonse Brot was born on 12 April 1807 in Paris. He studied at the Lycée Bonaparte (now the Lycée Condorcet), in the 9th arrondissement of Paris. Brot became a member of the romantic literary group les Jeunes-France (Young France), sometimes called les Bouzingos, which also included Théophile Gautier, Gérard de Nerval, Jules Vabre, Petrus Borel, Philothée O’Neddy, Augustus McKeat, Aloysius Bertrand, Joseph Bouchardy, Louis Boulanger, Achille Devéria, Eugène Devéria, Célestin Nanteuil and Jehan de Seigneur. He wrote many well-received dramas.

In 1836 a critic wrote of his work, "M. Alphonse Brot furiously loves women swimming in the ether. His heroines are always called Arièle, Stella; they are pure, they are heavenly, and the best eyes in the world would discover not the slightest blemish on their souls, or even on their white robes. ... His talent is a mixture of reveries and feelings that has difficulty capturing the colors of history..."

Brot and Antony Béraud were co-directors from 1840 to 1842 of the Théâtre de l'Ambigu-Comique on the Boulevard St-Martin, Paris. On 7 January 1847 Brot married Eugénie Girault-Duvivier. From 1848 to 1872 he worked with the Ministry of the Interior as head of the printing and book selling office. Brot was awarded the Legion of Honour on 15 August 1864.

He died on 3 January 1895 in Paris, and was buried in Montmartre cemetery. His body was moved to Père Lachaise Cemetery in 1901.

Works

Poetry
Chants d’Amour (1829) Ladvocat, Paris + L. Janet, Paris

Novels

Dramas

Vaudevilles

References

Sources

1807 births
1895 deaths
19th-century French poets
19th-century French novelists
19th-century French dramatists and playwrights